Amãna Bank is the first and only licensed commercial bank in Sri Lanka to conduct all its operations under the principles of Islamic banking and be fully disengaged from interest based transactions, offering the full spectrum of retail banking, SME banking, corporate banking, treasury and trade finance services.

With the mission of enabling growth and enriching lives, the bank reaches over 400,000 customers through a growing network of 33 branches, 20 self banking centres and 5,400+ ATM access points and has introduced a bouquet of customer conveniences such as online banking, online account opening, VISA debit card with SMS alerts, 365 day banking, Saturday banking, extended banking hours, 24x7 cash deposit machines and banking units exclusively for ladies.

Amãna Bank PLC is a stand-alone institution licensed by the Central Bank of Sri Lanka and listed on the Colombo Stock Exchange with Jeddah based IDB Group being the principal shareholder having a 29.97% stake of the Bank. The IDB Group is a ‘AAA’ rated multilateral development Financial institution with a capital base of over US$150 Billion which has a membership of 57 countries. Powered by the stability and support of the IDB Group along with other strategic shareholders including Bank Islam Malaysia, AB Bank of Bangladesh and Akbar Brothers, Amãna Bank is making strong inroads within the Sri Lankan banking industry and is focused on capitalising on the growing market potential for its unique banking model across the country.

The bank's head office is located at 486 Galle Road, Colombo, and it maintains branches at 33 locations around the country.

In April 2020, Fitch Ratings assigned Amana Bank PLC a rating of ("BB+" with a Stable Outlook).

See also 

 List of banks in Sri Lanka

References

External links 
 Official website of Amana Bank PLC
 Website of Central Bank of Sri Lanka

Banks of Sri Lanka
Banks established in 2009
Companies listed on the Colombo Stock Exchange
Sri Lankan companies established in 2009